RING finger protein 122 is a protein that in humans is encoded by the RNF122 gene.

The protein encoded by this gene contains a RING finger, a motif present in a variety of functionally distinct proteins and known to be involved in protein-protein and protein-DNA interactions.

References

Further reading

RING finger proteins